Río Luis  is a corregimiento in Santa Fé District, Veraguas Province, Panama with a population of 2,204 as of 2010. It was created by Law 58 of July 29, 1998, owing to the Declaration of Unconstitutionality of Law 1 of 1982. Its population as of 2000 was 1,708.

References

Corregimientos of Veraguas Province